Mama’s Big Ones is a compilation album of previously released material as noted below, by Cass Elliot.

Overview
Cass Elliot's solo tenure with Dunhill Records, inaugurated in the spring of 1968, had proven contentious, the label insisting the onetime member of the Mamas & Papas be billed as Mama Cass and that she resume recording in the soft rock vein which had afforded the Mamas & Papas' success.  Elliot would in 1971 claim that at Dunhill she had been "forced to be so bubble gum that I'd stick to the floor when I walked", and in fact Elliot's solo singles had been progressively less successful, Dunhill president Jay Lasker commenting after Elliot's sixth solo single stalled at #42 in early 1970 "'New World Coming' has gotten great airplay because it came along and expressed hope in the midst of despair. Unfortunately, it isn't selling all that well, so we're going back to an old theme. The message here - at least to us - is that 'the message record has had it'. [Now] Mama Cass is going to do love songs." 

In fact it was announced in July 1970 that Elliot would depart Dunhill for RCA Records, the anthology Mama's Big Ones being issued in October 1970 as a final album owed by Elliot to Dunhill. Mama's Big Ones featured nine of Elliot's ten Dunhill single releases - omitting 1968's "California Earthquake" - and adding the Mamas & Papas' hit "Words of Love" which featured Elliot as lead vocalist. Mama's Big Ones provided the album debut for the tracks "New World Coming", "A Song That Never Comes", "The Good Times Are Coming", "Don't Let the Good Life Pass You By" and "One Way Ticket" and "Ain’t Nobody Else Like You" which were all single releases (the last-named being the UK B-side of Elliot's version of "Easy Come Easy Go").

Track listing

Reception
The album was released in October 1970 and peaked at the #194 spot on the Billboard Charts.

Today
The album was reissued by MCA in 1980 and again by MCA, on CD, in 1987.

The album can be seen hanging on the wall of the character Leah in the 1996 British film Beautiful Thing while she is listening to "One Way Ticket". "It’s Getting Better", "Make Your Own Kind of Music", "Dream a Little Dream of Me", and "Move in a Little Closer, Baby" are also featured in the film.

Songs from the album (namely "It’s Getting Better", "Make Your Own Kind of Music", and "New World Coming") were used on the American television series Lost.

“Don’t Let the Good Life Pass You By” was a backing track and the name of Season 3 episode 8 of the NBC fantasy comedy The Good Place

References

Cass Elliot albums
1971 compilation albums
Pop rock compilation albums
Dunhill Records compilation albums
MCA Records compilation albums